Azampura, on banks of River Moosi,  is one of the old suburbs in Hyderabad, India and is close to Dabirpura. Other nearby areas include Saidabad, Chaderghat, Malakpet and Chanchalguda. There were 27,500 residents in Azampura as of 2003. Like many other Old City suburbs it has a majority Muslim population. Also the area is home to the deputy Chief Minister of Telangana, Mohammed Mehmood Ali.

Commercial area
Azampura's commercial area is concentrated around Masjid-e-Sahifa. There are many fruit stalls and restaurants which offer Hyderabad's famous non-vegetarian cuisine like biryani, haleem, nihari and kebabs.

The locality is facilitated by hospitals like Muslim Maternity Hospital and Thumbay Hospital.

Public transport
Azampura is extremely well connected to many suburbs around Hyderabad by buses run by TSRTC. It is also connected to long distance places by MGBS bus terminal. It also has  Malakpet railway station with MMTS  &  Suburban services to Lingampally, HiTech city,  Nampally,  Secunderabad and Falaknuma, Mahbubnagar, Kurnool,  Medchal, Ghatkesar,  Jangoan. Its also now connected to Hyd Metro network  through  Malakpet Metro Station.

Landmarks
Masjid-E-Sahifa is an important mosque in Azampura.

Old Post Sahifa is now defunct but was a major regional post office during the 1980s and 1990.

Azampura Chaman / rotary park is very known  landmark, that leads to another old well known landmark ' lorry Kanta'  / weigh bridge.

There are many playgrounds in surrounding areas,  but most famous is Tarzan ground,  host to many local cricket tournaments.it  also has a state public Library and a community  hall.

Azampura comes under Chaderghat  PS jurisdiction.

References
 

Neighbourhoods in Hyderabad, India